The Syro-Ephraimite War took place in the 8th century BC, when the Neo-Assyrian Empire was a great regional power. The tributary nations of Aram-Damascus (often called Aram) and the Kingdom of Israel (often called Ephraim because of the main tribe) decided to break away. The Kingdom of Judah, ruled by King Ahaz, refused to join the coalition. In 735 BC Aram-Damascus, under Rezin, and Israel, under Pekah, attempted to depose Ahaz through an invasion. Judah was being defeated and, according to 2 Chronicles 28, lost 120,000 troops in just one day. Many significant officials were killed, including the king's son Maaseiah. Many others were taken away as slaves. Telling of the same war,  states that Rezin and Pekah besieged Jerusalem but failed to capture it.

During the invasion, the Philistines and Edomites were taking advantage of the situation and raiding towns and villages in Judah. Ahaz asked Tiglath-Pileser III of Assyria for help. The Assyrians defended Judah, conquering Israel, Aram-Damascus and the Philistines, but the post-war alliance only brought more trouble for the king of Judah. Ahaz had to pay tribute to Tiglath-Pileser III with treasures from the Temple in Jerusalem and the royal treasury. He also built idols of Assyrian gods in Judah to find favor with his new ally.

Immanuel prophecy

Isaiah tells King Ahaz that the invasion will be unsuccessful and tells him to ask God for a sign. Ahaz refuses, claiming he does not want to test God. Isaiah then announces that God himself will choose the sign:

Isaiah 8 details another prophecy about a child by the name of Maher-shalal-hash-baz (Hebrew: מַהֵר שָׁלָל חָשׁ בַּז "Hurry to the spoils!" or "He has made haste to the plunder!"). Isaiah then explains that the significance of this name is that before this child can speak, Assyria will plunder both Syria and Ephraim. Isaiah concludes these prophecies concerning his children, Shear-Jashub (meaning "the remnant shall return"), Immanuel (meaning "God with us"), and Maher-shalal-hash-baz, by saying,
 The context continues into chapter 9 which also uses a birth of a child as its object.

See also
 Military history of the Neo-Assyrian Empire
 List of Israelite civil conflicts

References

External links
 http://www.biblegateway.com/passage/?search=Isaiah%207-12&version=NASB
 http://www.jewsforjudaism.org/questions-a-answers-primary-234/68-the-jewish-messiah/374-messiah--the-criteria
 http://www.ucgstp.org/bible/brp/2ki16a.htm
 http://www.bsw.org/?l=71811&a=Ani17.html

8th-century BC conflicts
8th century BC in the Kingdom of Judah
Ancient Israel and Judah
Hebrew Bible battles
Military history of the Assyrian Empire